Schalotomis is a monotypic moth genus in the family Erebidae erected by George Hampson in 1920. Its only species, Schalotomis roseothorax, was first described by Walter Rothschild in 1913. It is found in Peru.

References

Phaegopterina
Monotypic moth genera
Moths described in 1913
Moths of South America